Florence Bolles was an American author and screenwriter who worked in Hollywood during the silent era.

Biography 
Florence was born in San Francisco, California, to Levi Borland and Margaret Dempsey. She married Richard Bolles, and the pair had a daughter, Geraldine. She began writing screenplays in the mid-1910s; her first known credit was on 1915's In the Latin Quarter.

Selected filmography 

 Too Much Married (1921)
 The American Way (1919)
 The Fair Pretender (1918) 
 The Dormant Power (1917)
 The False Friend (1917)
 The Social Leper (1917)
 The Furnace Man (1915)
 In the Latin Quarter (1915)

References 

American women screenwriters
1888 births
1962 deaths
Writers from San Francisco
Screenwriters from California
20th-century American women writers
20th-century American screenwriters